The 2020–21 version of the Syrian Cup is the 51st edition to be played. It is the premier knockout tournament for football teams in Syria. Al-Wahda are the defending champions.

The competition has been disrupted because of the ongoing Syrian Civil War, where some games have been awarded as 3:0 victories due to teams not being able to compete.

The winners of the competition will enter the 2022 AFC Cup.

First round

Final phase

Bracket

Second round

Third round

Quarter-finals

Semi-finals

Final

References

Syrian Cup
Syria
Cup